Juan Manuel Nieves Cruz (born January 5, 1965) is a Puerto Rican professional baseball pitcher and coach who is currently the assistant pitching coach for the Detroit Tigers of Major League Baseball (MLB). He played for the Milwaukee Brewers of Major League Baseball (MLB) from 1986 to 1988. He has coached in MLB for the Chicago White Sox, Boston Red Sox, and Miami Marlins.

Playing career 
Nieves was signed by the Milwaukee Brewers, with a $115,000 signing bonus, after he had a 19–1 win–loss record with a 1.05 earned run average (ERA) during his senior season at the Avon Old Farms school in Connecticut.

On April 15, 1987, Nieves threw a no-hitter against the Baltimore Orioles, becoming the second-youngest player in Major League history to do so. He threw the only no-hitter for the Brewers until 2021. Nieves' no-hitter became the first ever thrown by a Puerto Rican in Major League Baseball. Nieves was mostly a starter, but on September 5, 1988, he did earn his only career save against the White Sox. He threw one perfect inning, closing out a 5–2 Brewers victory and saving the game for starter Don August.

After playing for the Brewers from 1986 to 1988, he suffered a career-ending arm injury.

Coaching career
Nieves worked as a minor league pitching instructor for the New York Yankees (1992–1996) and the White Sox (1999–2007) before joining the Chicago White Sox Major League staff as the bullpen coach serving for the five seasons. He was mentored by Don Cooper, first when Cooper was the White Sox' roving coordinator in their minor league hierarchy, and later when Cooper became the pitching coach of the Sox. They became really close, adapting similar pitching styles and was named as "Cooper's right-hand man". He was named Boston's  pitching coach on November 7, 2012. He brought over Cooper's style of pitching to the Red Sox organization. Nieves led the Red Sox to the second lowest earned run average in the American League as the team went on to win the World Series. After the Red Sox earned the second highest team ERA (4.86) to start the 2015 season, Nieves was dismissed by the team on May 7, 2015.

Nieves spent the next three seasons as pitching coach for the Miami Marlins, being dismissed after the 2018 season.

On November 6, 2020, the Detroit Tigers named Nieves as the team's assistant pitching coach for the 2021 season. Nieves had spent the previous two seasons as the pitching coach for the Toledo Mud Hens, the Tigers Triple-A affiliate.

See also
 List of Major League Baseball no-hitters

References

External links

1965 births
Living people
Beloit Brewers players
Boston Red Sox coaches
Chicago White Sox coaches
Detroit Tigers coaches
Denver Zephyrs players
El Paso Diablos players
Major League Baseball bullpen coaches
Major League Baseball pitchers
Major League Baseball pitching coaches
Major League Baseball players from Puerto Rico
Miami Marlins coaches
Milwaukee Brewers players
Puerto Rican expatriate baseball players in Canada
Sioux Falls Canaries players
Stockton Ports players
Vancouver Canadians players
People from Santurce, Puerto Rico